The 1998 NCAA Division I baseball season, play of college baseball in the United States organized by the National Collegiate Athletic Association (NCAA) began in the spring of 1998.  The season progressed through the regular season and concluded with the 1998 College World Series.  The College World Series, held for the fifty second time in 1998, consisted of one team from each of eight regional competitions and was held in Omaha, Nebraska, at Johnny Rosenblatt Stadium as a double-elimination tournament.  Southern California claimed the championship for the twelfth time, and first since 1978.

Realignment
Marshall departed the Southern Conference and Northern Illinois departed the Midwestern Collegiate Conference to join the Mid-American Conference.
UNC Greensboro and Wofford joined the Southern Conference.  UNC Greensboro was in the Big South Conference, while Wofford joined from NCAA Division II.
Marist and Rider left the Northeast Conference for the Metro Atlantic Athletic Conference.  Marist joined the Northern Division, while Rider became a part of the Southern.
Southeastern Louisiana left the Trans America Athletic Conference and joined the Southland Conference.

Format changes
The Big East Conference dissolved its divisions after one season.
The Mid-American Conference divided into two divisions of six.
The Southland Conference dissolved its divisions after two seasons.

Conference winners
This is a partial list of conference champions from the 1998 season.  The NCAA sponsored regional competitions to determine the College World Series participants.  Each of the eight regionals consisted of six teams competing in double-elimination tournaments, with the winners advancing to Omaha.  In order to provide all conference champions with an automatic bid, 10 conference champions participated in a play-in round.  The five winners joined the other 19 conference champions with automatic bids, 24 teams earned at-large selections.

Conference standings
The following is an incomplete list of conference standings:

College World Series

The 1998 season marked the fifty second NCAA Baseball Tournament, which culminated with the eight team College World Series.  The College World Series was held in Omaha, Nebraska.  The eight teams played a double-elimination format, with Southern California claiming their record twelfth championship with a 21–14 win over Arizona State in the final.

Bracket

Award winners

All-America team

References